The Maharashtra football team is an Indian football team representing Maharashtra in Indian state football competitions including the  Santosh Trophy.

They have appeared in the Santosh Trophy finals 15 times, and have won the trophy 4 times. Prior to 1962, the team competed as Bombay football team.

Honours
 Santosh Trophy
 Winners (4): 1954–55, 1963–64, 1990–91, 1999–2000
 Runners-up (12): 1945–46, 1947–48, 1951–52, 1956–57, 1957–58, 1959–60, 1961–62, 1976–77, 1984–85, 1992–93, 2005–06, 2015–16

National Games
 Gold medal (1): 1999
 Bronze medal (2): 2001, 2015

 B.C. Roy Trophy
 Runners-up (1): 1966–67

 M. Dutta Ray Trophy
 Runners-up (1): 1996

References

External links
 Maharashtra football association website (Western India Football Association)

Football in Maharashtra
Santosh Trophy teams
Sport in Maharashtra